Burhan Shahidi (also spelled Bao Erhan; 3 October 1894 – 27 August 1989) was a political leader in Xinjiang, China, during the 20th century.

Life

Early life
Burhan Shahidi was born in 1894 in the Russian Kazan Governorate to a Tatar family. His family was poor and he received little schooling in his early years. In 1912, after the Qing Dynasty was overthrown, he accompanied Tatar merchants to Dihua (now Ürümqi) in Xinjiang and worked as an apprentice and store-clerk.  In 1914, he was able to apply and receive Chinese citizenship from the Republic of China on account of his family's ancestry. He spoke Tatar, Uyghur, Mandarin Chinese, Russian, Turkish and some Arabic and acted as the interpreter for Yang Zengxin, the leader of Xinjiang at the time. Jadid leader Ismail Gasprinski inspired Burhan Shahidi.

In 1929, he was sent to Weimar Germany by Xinjiang's next leader Jin Shuren and studied political-economy in Berlin. He returned to Xinjiang in 1933 and held a number of roles in the provincial government including manager of a land development company. He played a key role in the Xinjiang Nationalities Congress of 1934.  At this Congress, the ethnonym Uyghur was adopted to describe the majority Turkic Muslims in the oases of the Tarim Basin.

Republic of China

In 1937, he was dispatched by the next governor, Sheng Shicai, to the Soviet Union to serve as a consular official in the border district of Zaysan.  The following year, he was recalled by Sheng, branded a "trotskyite" and imprisoned until 1944.   While in prison, Burhan wrote a Uyghur-Chinese-Russian Dictionary and translated Sun Yat-sen's Three People's Principles into Uyghur.

He was released by Wu Zhongxin, the Chinese Nationalist official who replaced Sheng Shicai.  In 1946, Burhan became the vice-chairman of a provincial coalition government formed between the Chinese Nationalists and the revolutionaries who had founded the  Second East Turkestan Republic (Second ETR) in the "Three Districts".  He was considered a political moderate between the Nationalist Chinese and Second ETR members of the coalition.

In 1947, Burhan was transferred to Nanjing and became an official in the central government under Chiang Kai-shek.  Later that year, he led a Xinjiang performance troupe to Taiwan and toured Keelung, Taipei, Taichung, and Kaoshiung.  The tour came shortly after the February 28 Incident, which left many islanders hostile to mainlanders.  Burhan gave speeches that appealed to national unity.

In 1948, he returned to Xinjiang and became the president of the Xinjiang Academy, the precursor to the Xinjiang University.  He favored Chinese nationalism and disagreed with Turkic nationalist positions of Muhammad Amin Bughra.  In January 1949, he replaced Masud Sabri as the chairman of Xinjiang Provincial Government.  Sabri was anti-Soviet and opposed the Soviet-backed Ehmetjan Qasim (Akhmedjan Kasimov), who was the vice-chairman of the provincial government.  He helped stabilize the province's finances, which was ravaged by the spread of inflation throughout Nationalist China, by restoring the local currency. Anti Soviet sentiment was espoused by Isa Yusuf Alptekin while Pro Soviet sentiment was espoused by Burhan. The Soviets were angered by Isa.

In September of that year, he negotiated with Deng Liqun, the Chinese Communist representative sent by Mao Zedong to the province during the waning days of the Chinese Civil War.  On 26 September, Burhan joined Nationalist general Tao Zhiyue in announcing the surrender of the province to the People's Liberation Army, paving the way for the "peaceful liberation" of Xinjiang.  A week later, the People's Republic of China (PRC) was founded in Beijing.

People's Republic of China

On 17 December 1949, the Xinjiang Provincial People's Government was established and Burhan became the chairman.  Saifuddin Azizi was the deputy chairman.  He joined the Chinese Communist Party at the end of the year.  In 1952, he headed the preparatory committee to create the Xinjiang Uyghur Autonomous Region (XUAR).  In 1955, Azizi became the first chairman of the XUAR, and Burhan's role in the Xinjiang government lessened.

Burhan was a co-founder and the first chairman of the Islamic Association of China. In this capacity, he became an able diplomat in the PRC's outreach to the Islamic world.  In February 1956, he led a cultural and religious delegation on a tour of Egypt, Sudan, Ethiopia, Syria and Lebanon.  As a direct result of his diplomatic work, Egypt under President Gamal Abdel Nasser in May 1956 became the first country in Middle East to recognize the PRC and sever ties with the Republic of China on Taiwan. It was the first country to recognize Beijing in six years and the recognition broke the diplomatic blockade imposed by the West.  In July, he returned to the region leading China's hajj mission to Saudi Arabia, where he met King Saud and visited King Hussein of Jordan, though neither country had diplomatic relations with the PRC.  On the same trip, he also met with President Nazim al-Kudsi of Syria and Amir Muhammad al-Badr of North Yemen.  Both countries switched their recognition to the PRC in 1956.

On 4 November 1956, Burhan and Hu Yaobang, Guo Moruo helped lead a massive public rally and parade in Beijing with over 400,000 people in Tiananmen Square to support Egypt and denounce Anglo-French imperialism in the Suez Crisis.  In the spring of 1959, he led a delegation to Iraq to support Prime Minister Abd al-Karim Qasim who had overthrown the Iraqi monarchy the previous year and founded a pro-socialist republic.

Burhan supervised Chinese Muslim participation in the hajj until the Cultural Revolution, when he was accused of being a collaborator and a foreigner, and imprisoned for eight years.  Afterwards, he was rehabilitated and served as a vice-chairman of the second, third, fifth, sixth and seventh Chinese People's Political Consultative Conference National Committee.  His memoir, Fifty Years in Xinjiang was published in 1984.

In 1985, to support the return of the critically endangered Père David's deer to China, Burhan helped found and chair the China Milu Foundation, now known as the China Biodiversity Conservation and Green Development Foundation.

He died in 1989 and is buried in the foothills of the Tian Shan in Xinjiang.

See also
Chinese Tatars

References

Citations

Sources

External links 
 

1894 births
1989 deaths
People from Tatarstan
People from Tetyushsky Uyezd
Volga Tatar people
Chinese Communist Party politicians
Vice Chairpersons of the National Committee of the Chinese People's Political Consultative Conference
Political office-holders in Xinjiang
Jadids
Emigrants from the Russian Empire to China